The Hunan Library is a provincial comprehensive public library located at North Shaoshan Road, Changsha City, Hunan Province. The Library is the first provincial-level public library named after "library" in China. It is a National Key Protection Unit for Ancient Books in China.

History
Hunan Library, formerly known as the Hunan Library and Education Museum, was built in March 1904 in Changsha.

On December 28, 2017, the New Hall of Hunan Library officially laid the foundation in Meixi Lake, Xiangjiang New Area, Changsha City.

References

Libraries in China
Buildings and structures in Hunan
Libraries established in 1904